The Northern Talent Cup is a one-make European motorcycle racing series. It was created to give young riders from Central and Northern European countries a first stepping stone on the road to MotoGP.

The series races on the KTM 250 Standard, and uses the European Talent Cup as a blueprint. One of the top riders will have a chance to race in the Red Bull MotoGP Rookies Cup the next year, and at least two will be take part in the Rookies cup selection.

In the inaugural season in 2020, Hungarian rider Soma Görbe won the title, and sixth place German Freddie Heinrich raced in the 2021 Red Bull MotoGP Rookies Cup, and in 2021, Czech rider Jakub Gurecký won the cup, and he and Belgian runner-up Lorenz Luciano were selected for the 2022 Red Bull MotoGP Rookies Cup.

References

External links
 Northern Talent Cup at Fédération Internationale de Motocyclisme website
 What is the Northern Talent Cup? at MotoGP website
Round 5 Most CZ report

2020 establishments in Europe
Motorcycle racing